The 2009 attack on the Dutch royal family occurred on 30 April at Apeldoorn, Netherlands, when a man drove his car at high speed into a parade which included Queen Beatrix, Crown Prince Willem-Alexander and other members of the royal family. The attack took place on the Dutch national holiday of Koninginnedag (or Queen's Day).

The driver deliberately drove through people lining the street watching the parade, resulting in eight deaths, including the attacker, and ten injuries. The car missed the royal family and crashed into a monument at the side of the road. No members of the royal family were harmed.  It was the first attack on the Dutch royal family in modern times.

The driver, identified as 38-year-old Dutch national Karst Roeland Tates, was treated by members of the fire brigade and police, taken into custody and transported to a hospital. He died the next day, becoming the seventh person killed by injuries suffered during the attack. A 46-year-old woman died from her injuries days later, on 8 May, bringing the total number of deaths to eight.

Location of the attack

Around 11:50 am, just before an open-top bus carrying the Dutch royal family made its last turn towards the palace of Het Loo in Apeldoorn, a black older-model Suzuki Swift crashed through the onlookers, just missing the bus carrying the royal family members, and slammed into De Naald, an obelisk-shaped royal monument. Seconds after the attack, Red Cross and police first responders were providing basic life-saving treatment to the 17 victims, who were all taken to nearby hospitals.  After the crash, the vehicle was examined by the anti-terrorism department and local police.

The attack and search were shown on live TV. Members of the Dutch royal family who were waving at the crowds gathered were shown standing up to look over at the crashed car, visibly shocked and gasping with their hands over their mouths.

Attacker

Karst Roeland Tates (6 March 1971 – 1 May 2009), a 38-year-old Dutchman, was identified as the driver of the car.  After the attack, he was treated by the fire department and transferred to a hospital for further care. Tates was from Huissen, a small town in the eastern Netherlands, and had no criminal record. Police said he confessed in his car, while bleeding, saying that he intended to hit the royal family.

Tates died in the early morning of 1 May of brain injuries from the crash. An autopsy was performed; no traces of alcohol were found in his blood.

Tates' motive remains unclear.  He had called his mother to congratulate her on her birthday on the day before the attack and said he was looking forward to her birthday party on 3 May. He left no indication he was planning anything. Tates' parents describe him as kind and attentive, and although there had been periods of financial trouble in his past, he had recently found work. According to his parents, Tates held no ill will towards the royal family and had described the Queen as a "stabilising force".

The friends and acquaintances of Tates described him as kind, and they never expected him to do this act.

However, other reports revealed that Tates "had embarked on a mission of vengeance against society after losing his job as a night-shift security guard" earlier in the year and had been facing eviction from his house.  He told a neighbour he was depressed and had been out of contact with family for months.

The official investigation established that the attack was premeditated but not well prepared.  The report said the people killed were innocent bystanders who were watching the parade. Tates did not intend to kill many people; he had scouted the area beforehand but when he returned for his assault, the situation had changed and people were standing in a previously cordoned-off street.

The public prosecutor assumed Tates acted alone and concluded that his actions would never be totally explained.

Aftermath
A few hours after the attack, Queen Beatrix addressed the nation in an emotional video message.

At a press conference that afternoon, police reported that Tates, who was still conscious but severely injured after the accident, had told police that it was a deliberate act aimed at the royal family. He had no prior history of psychological problems, and there are no indications that any sort of terrorist group was involved. Initial rumours that the car was rigged with explosives were later denied by the police.

Cancelled events

Following the attack, at 12:15 pm local time, it was announced that all planned celebrations in Apeldoorn were cancelled. Later that day, many other events across the Netherlands were also cancelled, shortened or toned down significantly – including all activities in Rotterdam and many events in Amsterdam.

As the news of the attack spread, many people spontaneously lowered the national flag to half-mast (the normal flag instruction on Queen's Day is to fly the flag, with orange banner, normally, and many people follow this instruction). Prime Minister Jan Peter Balkenende announced the order to lower all flags on government buildings to half-mast.

Initially, it was feared that the "act of madness by a lone attacker" endangered the long-held yearly tradition of the royal family's mingling with the Dutch people on Queen's Day.

Memorial service
On 8 May, a memorial service was held in the Orpheus theatre in Apeldoorn, with speeches by Prime Minister Jan Peter Balkenende and mayor of Apeldoorn Fred de Graaf. It was attended by the Queen, the Prince of Orange, Princess Máxima, Princess Margriet and Pieter van Vollenhoven as well as 1,200 guests. Some 5,000 people watched the ceremony on screens placed outside on Apeldoorn's central market square and millions more on live television. Hours after the memorial, it was announced that after being in critical condition for over a week, an eighth person had died of injuries sustained in the attack.

Monument
On 29 April 2010, Queen Beatrix and Mayor De Graaf unveiled a monument for the seven victims, near the location of the attack. The work by artist  resembles a box containing seven white balloons among several blue balloons, representing vulnerability, festivity and mourning.

2010 bomb panic
Just over a year after the attack, on 4 May 2010, during Remembrance of the Dead ceremony on Dam Square in Amsterdam attended by Queen Beatrix, a 39-year-old man dressed as an Orthodox Jew and carrying a suitcase shouted "Bomb!" during a two-minute silence. This was followed by the yell of a woman and a falling security fence, which according to witnesses sounded like a gunshot. It sparked panic in the crowd of 20,000, causing a stampede that injured 87 people. Dozens fell on the ground, and some broke bones as a result. The man, who was nicknamed in the media as the Damschreeuwer (meaning Dam Screamer), or "The Rabbi", was claimed to have been drunk at the time, according to his lawyer.

See also
Vehicle-ramming attack#Terrorism

Notes

References

External links

 The attack as shown live on Dutch TV
 BBC News In pictures: Dutch parade attack

2009 attack on the Dutch Royal Family
April 2009 events in Europe
April 2009 crimes
Attacks on parades
Failed assassination attempts in Europe
2009
Dutch monarchy
Filmed killings
Murders by motor vehicle
Mass murder in 2009
Mass murder in the Netherlands
Murder–suicides in Europe
2009 murders in the Netherlands
Attacks in the Netherlands
Attack